Serrano High School is a public high school in the California High Desert community of Phelan, California. It serves students from Phelan, Wrightwood and Piñon Hills. It is part of the Snowline Joint Unified School District. The school is named for the Serrano people. Its mascot is the Diamondback.

Rankings
Serrano High School was nationally ranked #1,607 for best high schools for the 2009-2010 school year according to US News. With a student teacher ratio of 27:1, Serrano pulled a 21.5 on the college readiness index. Serrano was also ranked 38th within California.

Notable alumni
Jamaal Franklin 2009 graduate, a professional basketball player who plays for the Sichuan Blue Whales of the Chinese Basketball Association (CBA)
Jilon VanOver 1996 graduate, actor, best known for playing the role of Ransom Bray on Hatfields & McCoys.
Caleb Calvert Professional Soccer Player for the Colorado Rapids on loan to the USL team Charlotte Independence
Aaron Long Professional soccer player who plays as a defender for New York Red Bulls.

Sports 
The school prides itself on academic and athletic success, setting the common GPA requirements to be involved in athletics and clubs. From a Volleyball and football team to a regionally-recognized cross country team the school has proven themselves athletic in the Mojave region.

References

External links
 

High schools in San Bernardino County, California
Public high schools in California
Victor Valley
Wrightwood, California